

The Peninsulas zone is a wine zone located in South Australia that covers the entire Yorke Peninsula, an adjoining portion of the Mid North of South Australia, the portion of Eyre Peninsula south of a line of latitude approximately in line with Crystal Brook and the islands located off the adjoining coastline.  The zone is bounded by the Far North zone to its north by the Mount Lofty Ranges zone to its east. The term ‘The Peninsulas’ was registered as an Australian Geographical Indication under the Wine Australia Corporation Act 1980 on 27 December 1996.

As of 2017, the zone does not have any constituent regions, although the locality around the regional city of Port Lincoln, while not officially recognised, is informally known as the ‘Southern Eyre Peninsula region’. As of 2017, Halliday reports that there are three wineries in the ‘Southern Eyre Peninsula region’, and one on Yorke Peninsula. Alternatively, the plantings when categorised by varietals are red, white and ‘unknown’. The quantity of wine grape harvested in 2014 was reported as being .

See also

South Australian wine

Citations and references

Citations

References

Wine regions of South Australia
Eyre Peninsula
Yorke Peninsula
1996 establishments in Australia